New Alexandria may refer to:

New Alexandria, Ohio, USA
New Alexandria, Pennsylvania, USA
New Alexandria, Virginia, USA
New Alexandria, Egypt